Marine Drive is a 1955 Indian Hindi-language film, starring Ajit, Bina Rai in lead roles.

The film deals with the smuggling business and underworld crime.

It was the first film that G. P. Sippy released under his production house Sippy Films. Sahir Ludhianvi composed lyrics for the film and told Sippy that because Sippy did not drink, he would never understand the lyrics "Mujhko na koi hosh na gham, main nashe main hoon" (English: "Neither me nor any conscious sorrow, I'm drunk, I am") from the film.

Cast
 Ajit as Ajit Prasad
 Bina Rai as Beena Khanna
 K. N. Singh as Mr. Khanna
 Johnny Walker as Johny

Soundtrack

References

External links
 Marine Drive at the Internet Movie Database

1955 films
1950s Hindi-language films
Films scored by Datta Naik
Indian black-and-white films